Navarretia breweri is a species of flowering plant in the phlox family known by the common name Brewer's navarretia. It is native to much of the western United States, where it grows in open habitat types.

It is a hairy, glandular annual herb producing an erect, branching brown or reddish stem up to 8 centimeters tall and wide. The small gray-green leaves have tiny needlelike lobes. The inflorescence is a rounded head filled with leaflike green bracts edged with pointed lobes. The flowers tucked amidst the bracts are yellow in color and under a centimeter long. The corolla is divided into five rounded lobes each about a millimeter long.

External links
Jepson Manual Treatment
Photo gallery

breweri
Flora of the Western United States
Flora of California
Flora of the Rocky Mountains
Flora of the Sierra Nevada (United States)
Flora without expected TNC conservation status